The 2004 African Men's Handball Championship was the 16th edition of the African Men's Handball Championship, held in Cairo, Egypt, from 8 to 18 April 2004. It acted as the African qualifying tournament for the 2005 World Championship in Tunisia.

Egypt win their fourth title beating Tunisia in the final game 31–28.

Qualified teams

First round
All times are local (UTC+2).

Group A

Group B

Group C

Second round

Group E

Group F

Placement matches

Group 10–11th place

Group 7–9th place

Knockout stage

Semifinals

Fifth place game

Third place game

Final

Final ranking

All Star Team
The All-star team and award winners were announced

Other awards

References

African handball championships
Handball
A
Handball
Handball in Egypt
2000s in Cairo
Sports competitions in Cairo
April 2004 sports events in Africa